Burwell is both a surname and a masculine given name. Notable people with the name include:

Surname:
Alan Burwell (born 1943), English rugby league player
Armistead Burwell (planter), American planter
Bill Burwell (1895–1973), American baseball player
Bryan Burwell (1955–2014), American sportswriter
Carter Burwell (born 1955), American film score composer
Cliff Burwell (1898–1977) American pianist and songwriter
Dick Burwell (born 1940), American baseball player
Guy Burwell (born 1965), American illustrator
Jim Burwell (1898–1974), Alcoholics Anonymous founding member
Leonidas Burwell (1817–1879), Canadian businessman and politician
Lilian Thomas Burwell (born 1927), American artist 
Lois Burwell (born 1960), British makeup artist
Mahlon Burwell (1783–1846), Canadian politician
Paul Burwell (1949–2007), English musician
Sylvia Mathews Burwell (born 1965), American businesswoman and 22nd U.S. Secretary of Health and Human Services
William A. Burwell (1780–1821), American politician
James F.A. Burwell (born 1999), British, Geographer

Given name:
Burwell Bassett (1764–1841), American politician
Burwell B. Bell III (born 1947), United States Army general
Burwell Jones (1933–2021), American swimmer
Burwell Boykin Lewis (1838–1885), American politician
Burwell C. Ritter (1810–1880), American politician

References

Masculine given names